Arizona Mills is an outlet shopping mall in Tempe, Arizona within the Phoenix metropolitan area and it is one of the tourist destinations in Phoenix, Arizona and it was owned by the Mills Corporation (which owned 25%) and Taubman Centers. However, Taubman has since sold the remaining 75% stake to Simon, who purchased it in 2007 from the Mills Corporation. It opened on November 20, 1997, with 6,000 parking spaces and approximately 200 retailers. It is currently anchored by Old Navy, Off Broadway Shoe Warehouse, American Freight, Forever 21, Harkins Theatres, H&M, IMAX, Legoland Discovery Center, Rainforest Cafe, Sea Life Aquarium, Tilt Studio, Ross Dress for Less, Marshalls, Camille La Vie, Conn's, and Burlington Coat Factory. The mall is located on the Southeast corner of US 60 and I-10.

Despite the presence of 'Mills' in its name, it is not geographically close to or affiliated with Mill Avenue, a shopping and entertainment district near Hayden Butte to the north. The name comes from that of the property developer, formerly known as the Mills Corporation.

Like other Mills Centers, Arizona Mills has abstract graphics from the entrances and inside the whole mall. Likewise for this mall, numerous artworks are displayed throughout Arizona Mills from the people of Arizona.

In June 2008, the mall's website was changed from its former Mills Corporation format to its Simon Malls format along with 16 other sister Simon-Mills malls.  It was the last Simon-Mills mall to make the switch.  It is one of three malls Simon currently owns in Arizona, with Phoenix Premium Outlets in Chandler & Tucson Premium outlets being the others.  It is the third mall Simon has ever owned in Arizona, previously having owned Southgate Mall in Yuma, Arizona, and Metrocenter Mall in Phoenix, Arizona which is now owned by Carlyle Development Group.

See also 
 List of shopping malls

References

External links
 Arizona Mills website

Shopping malls established in 1997
Outlet malls in the United States
Buildings and structures in Tempe, Arizona
Simon Property Group
Shopping malls in Maricopa County, Arizona